The 2020–21 season was the 119th season of competitive football in Italy.

National teams

Men

Italy national football team

Friendlies

2020–21 UEFA Nations League A

Group 1

2022 FIFA World Cup qualification

Group C

UEFA Euro 2020

Group A

Knockout phase

Women

Italy women's national football team

Friendlies

UEFA Women's Euro 2021 qualifying

Group B

2023 FIFA Women's World Cup qualification

Group G

League season

Men

Promotions and relegations (pre-season)
Teams promoted to Serie A
 Benevento
 Crotone
 Spezia

Teams relegated from Serie A
 SPAL
 Brescia
 Lecce

Teams promoted to Serie B
 Monza
 Vicenza
 Reggina
 Reggiana

Teams relegated from Serie B
 Perugia
 Trapani
 Juve Stabia
 Livorno

Serie A

Serie B

Serie C

Serie D

Women

Serie A (women)

Cup competitions

Coppa Italia

Final

Supercoppa Italiana

Coppa Italia (women)

Final

Supercoppa Italiana (women)

Final

UEFA competitions

UEFA Champions League

Group stage

Group B

Group D

Group F

Group G

Knockout phase

Round of 16 

|}

UEFA Europa League

UEFA Europa League qualifying phase and play-off round

Second qualifying round

|}

Third qualifying round

|}

Play-off round

|}

Group stage

Group A

Group F

Group H

Knockout phase

Round of 32

|}

Round of 16

|}

Quarter-finals

|}

Semi-finals

|}

UEFA Youth League

On 17 February 2021, the UEFA Executive Committee cancelled the tournament.

UEFA Champions League Path

|}

UEFA Women's Champions League

Knockout phase

Round of 32

|}

Round of 16

|}

Notes

References 

 
Seasons in Italian football
Football
Football
Italy
Italy
2020 sport-related lists